Sir George Jefferson  (26 March 1921 – 1 September 2012) was a British aeronautical engineer, and the first chairman of British Telecom (BT); he was largely responsible for its privatisation in 1984.

Early life
He attended a grammar school in north-west Kent, leaving at the age of 16.

Career

Second World War
He was commissioned as an officer in the Royal Army Ordnance Corps (RAOC), later joining REME. For the latter stages of the war he worked in government research, developing automated anti-aircraft weapons.

English Electric
In 1952 he became head of the guided weapon division of English Electric (in Hertfordshire).

BAC
BAC took over EE in 1960.

British Aerospace
British Aerospace took over BAC in 1977. At British Aerospace he looked after the development of the Rapier anti-aircraft missile, as head of the guided weapons division.

British Telecom
He was made deputy chairman of the Post Office (GPO), becoming the first chairman and chief executive of British Telecom on 1 September 1980. He saw through the company's privatisation. There was widespread hostility against its privatisation. This first privatisation of a British utility would mostly lay the ground for the subsequent privatisations of the 1980s; he largely made BT's privatisation take place. Jefferson retired in 1987.

Personal life
He married in 1943, having three sons; his first wife died in 1998. He remarried. He received the CBE in the 1969 New Year Honours and was knighted in the 1981 New Year Honours. He later moved to Perth in Australia.

See also
 Colin Baron, developer of the Rapier missile

References

External links
 Telegraph obituary September 2012

1921 births
2012 deaths
British Aircraft Corporation
British chief executives
British Telecom people
Commanders of the Order of the British Empire
Fellows of the Royal Aeronautical Society
History of telecommunications in the United Kingdom
Knights Bachelor
Royal Aeronautical Society Gold Medal winners
Royal Army Ordnance Corps officers
Royal Electrical and Mechanical Engineers officers
British Army personnel of World War II